Simeon Solomon (9 October 1840 – 14 August 1905) was a British painter associated with the Pre-Raphaelites who was noted for his depictions of Jewish life and same-sex desire.  His career was cut short as a result of public scandal following his arrests and convictions for attempted sodomy in 1873 and 1874.

Biography

Solomon was born into a prominent Jewish family. He was the eighth and last child born to merchant Michael (Meyer) Solomon and artist Catherine (Kate) Levy. Solomon was a younger brother to fellow painters Abraham Solomon (1824–1862) and Rebecca Solomon (1832–1886).

Born and educated in London, Solomon started receiving lessons in painting from his older brother around 1850. He started attending Carey's Art Academy in 1852. His older sister first exhibited her works at the Royal Academy during the same year.

As a student at the Royal Academy Schools, Solomon was introduced through Dante Gabriel Rossetti to other members of the Pre-Raphaelite circle, as well as the poet Algernon Charles Swinburne and the painter Edward Burne-Jones in 1857.  His first exhibition was at the Royal Academy in 1858.  He continued to hold exhibitions of his work at the Royal Academy between 1858 and 1872.  In addition to the literary paintings favoured by the Pre-Raphaelite school, Solomon's subjects often included scenes from the Hebrew Bible and genre paintings depicting Jewish life and rituals.  His association with Swinburne led to his illustrating Swinburne's controversial novel Lesbia Brandon in 1865.

In 1873, Simeon was arrested for soliciting in public toilets and having sex with a 60-year-old stableman named George Roberts. Both men were charged with indecent exposure and an attempt to commit buggery. Both were found guilty, fined £100 and sentenced to 18 months hard labour.  He was arrested again in 1874 in Paris on a similar charge, after which he was sentenced to spend three months in prison.

After his prosecutions he no longer exhibited, but his work was collected by such figures as Oscar Wilde, John Addington Symonds, Count Eric Stenbock, and Walter Pater.

In 1884, he was admitted to the workhouse where he continued to produce work, but his life and talent were blighted by alcoholism. Twenty years later in 1905, he died from complications brought on by his alcoholism. He was buried at the Jewish Cemetery in Willesden.

Examples of his work are on permanent display at the Victoria and Albert Museum, Wightwick Manor in Wolverhampton, and at Leighton House in west London. Retrospectives of his work have been held at the Birmingham Museum and Art Gallery in 2005–6, and in London at the Ben Uri Gallery in 2006.

Exhibitions

1906 
 Paintings and Drawings by the Late Simeon Solomon, Baillie Gallery, 54 Baker St, London. 9 December 1905–13 January 1906
 Winter Exhibition of Works of the Old Masters and Deceased Masters of the British School, Royal Academy, London. 1 January–10 March 1906
 Exhibition of Jewish Art and Antiquities, Whitechapel Art Gallery. 7 November–16 December 1906
 Exeter Museum and Art Gallery. April 1906

1907 
 Jewish Exhibition, Gallery of Ancient and Modern Art, Berlin

1908 
 Whitechapel Art Gallery. March 1908
 Franco-British Exhibition, London. July–August 1908

1913 
 Pre-Raphaelite Painters from Collections in Lancashire, Tate Britain, London. 17 July 1913–28 September 1913

1923 
 National Gallery of British Art (Tate). July 1923

1934 
 Jewish Art, Ben Uri Gallery. May 1934

1946 
 Subjects of Jewish Interest, Ben Uri Gallery. December 1946

1964 
 Exhibition of English Watercolours, Leger Galleries

1965 
 Exhibition of English Watercolours 18th & 19th Century, Leger Galleries

1966 
 Exhibition of Paintings and Drawings by Simeon Solomon, Durlacher Brothers Gallery, 538 Madison Ave, NYC. In May the exhibition moved to Wellesley College, Wellesley, MA. April–May 1966

1985 
 Acquisitions of the Friends of the Art Museums of Israel, Ben Uri Gallery. March 1985
 Solomon: A family of painters—Abraham Solomon, 1823-1862, Rebecca Solomon, 1832-1886, Simeon Solomon, 1840-1905. Geffrye Museum, London, 8 November–31 December 1985; Birmingham Museum & Art Gallery, 18 January–9 March 1986

2001 
 From Prodigy to Outcast: Simeon Solomon, Pre-Raphaelite Artist, Jewish Museum, London. March 2001–May 2001

2002 
 Solomon Art Exhibition, Birmingham Museums and Art Gallery. April 2002–June 2002

2005 
 Love Revealed: Simeon Solomon and the Pre-Raphaelites, Birmingham Museum and Art Gallery. 1 October 2005–15 January 2006
 Waking Dreams: The Art of the Pre-Raphaelites from the Delaware Art Museum, Various Locations in the UK and USA. 19 March 2005–29 July 2007

2006 
 Love Revealed: Simeon Solomon and the Pre-Raphaelites, Museum Villa Stuck, Munich. 9 March–18 June 2006
 Love Revealed: Simeon Solomon and the Pre-Raphaelites, Ben Uri Gallery, The London Jewish Museum of Art. 11 September–26 November 2006

2008 
 Blake's Shadow: William Blake and his Artistic Legacy, Whitworth Art Gallery, Manchester. 26 January 2008–20 April 2008

2010 
 The Pre-Raphaelites and Italy, Museo d'Arte della città di Ravenna, Ravenna, Italy. 28 February 2010–6 June 2010
 The Pre-Raphaelites and Italy, Ashmolean Museum, Oxford. 15 September 2010–5 December 2010

2017 
 Queer British Art 1861-1967, Tate Britain, 5 April–1 October 2017, included seven works by Solomon and a performance of A Vision of Love Revealed in Sleep, Neil Bartlett's one-man homage to Solomon, performed 7 July 2017.

Gallery

In literature
In Oscar Wilde's long prison letter to Lord Alfred Douglas, De Profundis, Wilde writes of his bankruptcy: "That all my charming things were to be sold: my Burne-Jones drawings: my Whistler drawings: my Monticelli: my Simeon Solomons: my china: my Library…"

See also
 Solomon Joseph Solomon - British painter

References and sources
References

Sources
 Geoffrey Wigoder, "Everyman's Judaica: an encyclopedic dictionary", Keter Publishing House Jerusalem, 1975, p. 562

Further reading
Colin Cruise et al. (ed), Love Revealed: Simeon Solomon and the Pre-Raphaelites, London: Merrett/Birmingham Museum and Art Gallery, 2005, 
Simon Reynolds, The Vision of Simeon Solomon, Oak Knoll Press, 1984, 
Solomon: A family of painters: Abraham Solomon, 1823–1862, Rebecca Solomon, 1832–1886, Simeon Solomon, 1840–1905: Geffrye Museum, London, 8 November–31 December 1985 [and] Birmingham Museum & Art Gallery 18 January–9 March 1986, Inner London Education Authority, 1986,

External links

Self-Portrait by Simeon Solomon at age 19 (1859)
The Simeon Solomon Research Archive, a wide-ranging repository of information about the artist and his artist siblings Abraham and Rebecca
Birmingham Museums & Art Gallery's Pre-Raphaelite Online Resource  includes many works by Simeon Solomon
"Fallen angel'", article by Neil Bartlett from The Guardian, 7 October 2005.
A Vision of Love Revealed in Sleep, Neil Bartlett's one-man homage to Simeon Solomon, performed at the Tate Britain, 7 July 2017. 
"The Biblical Illustrations of Simeon Solomon" by Simon Cooke, PhD
"Simeon Solomon" by Sidney Colvin, from English Painters of the Present Day (1871)
 
Works by Simeon Solomon in the collection of the Tate
Works by Simeon Solomon in the collection of the V&A, including works photographed by Frederick Hollyer
Simeon Solomon entry at ArtUK.org

1840 births
1905 deaths
19th-century English male artists
19th-century English painters
19th-century British LGBT people
20th-century English male artists
20th-century English painters
20th-century LGBT people
Artists' Rifles soldiers
Burials at Willesden Jewish Cemetery
English Jews
English male painters
Gay painters
Jewish painters
English gay artists
Gay Jews
English LGBT painters
Orientalist painters
Painters from London
People convicted for homosexuality in the United Kingdom
People from the City of London
Pre-Raphaelite painters
Royal Society of Portrait Painters
Sibling artists